Lasiarchis is a genus of moths in the family Gelechiidae.

Species
 Lasiarchis hirsuta Janse, 1958
 Lasiarchis pycnodes (Meyrick, 1909)

References

Gelechiinae